West Bengal Joint Entrance Examination or the WBJEE is a state-government controlled centralised test, conducted by the West Bengal Joint Entrance Examinations Board for admission to many private and governmental engineering institutions in West Bengal.

The test is taken after the 12th grade for admission to graduation (also known as Bachelor's) courses. The exam can be taken by those who studied Pure Science and Vocational 10+2 stream in plus two level with the specific subjects tested in the examination, which are Physics, Chemistry and Mathematics.

In 2022, a total of 81,393 candidates appeared for the WBJEE 2022 exam and 80,132 passed the exam. Students of both West Bengal Council of Higher Secondary Education, and West Bengal State Council of Technical and Vocational Education and Skill Development
and the Central Board of Secondary Education, Council for the Indian School Certificate Examinations board take the test, though it is dominated by the former.

The WBJEE includes the likes of Top universities of India like Jadavpur University, Calcutta University, University of Kalyani, top government engineering colleges like Kalyani Government Engineering College, Jalpaiguri Government Engineering College, Purulia Government Engineering College, Coochbehar Government Engineering College, Ghani Khan Choudhury Institute of Engineering & Technology and few private institutions

History 
In 2020, WBJEE exam was conducted on 2 February 2020 for admissions to various undergraduate engineering courses in West Bengal. 
From 2012, the old pattern was Phased out and the WBJEE would consist of only MCQ questions which differs from the previous years by the fact that 2 Marks Short answers type questions are replaced by MCQ with the same weightage of marks. In 2016 there will be a different type of pattern in Biology question paper.  Category-I consists of (Q.1 to Q.90) carrying one mark each, for which only one option is correct. Category-II consists of (Q.91 to Q.105) carrying two marks each, for which only one option is correct. Category-III consists of (Q.106 to Q.120) carrying two marks each, for which one or more than one option may be correct.  Starting from 2012, all papers consist of 80 MCQ type question divided in two section. Section one consists of 60 MCQs of 1 marks each and Section two consists of the remaining 20 MCQs of 2 marks each.
Negative marking is applicable. 30% of the total marks of a question will be deducted for every incorrect answer. 
In 2006, the WBJEE contained only objective-type MCQ (Multiple Choice Question) type questions. This announcement attracted mixed reactions with some applauding it as a step towards the future while others have said that opting for MCQ when other tests were slowly phasing out MCQ because of studies showing MCQ failed to properly judge aptitude is a folly.

The WBJEE 2008 was Postponed Due To Paper Leak, after the Physics, Chemistry and Biology papers were leaked. Two persons, Arun Chowdhury and Mihir Dandapatt, were arrested on Saturday in West Midnapore's Ghatal, where the three papers were being sold for Rs 2.5 lacs.

WBJEE 2011 exam was postponed from 17 April 2011 to 22 May due to election date issues in West Bengal.

For 2020–2021 academic session, the Board will conduct the Common Entrance Examination for admission to Undergraduate Courses in Engineering & Technology, Pharmacy and Architecture in Universities, Govt. Colleges and Self-Financed Institutes in the State.

Participating Institutes 

Various colleges intake students based on WBJEE Ranks. Total 112 Institutes are taking admission through this Entrance Exam. The Central Selection Council conducts a counselling session for students where colleges are allotted to them. The institutions that take part in this session are:-

References

External links 
 Central Selection Committee

Standardised tests in India
1962 establishments in West Bengal
Education in West Bengal